The hypolimnion or under lake is the dense, bottom layer of water in a thermally-stratified lake. The word hypolimnion is derived from the Greek "limnos" meaning "lake". It is the layer that lies below the thermocline.

Typically the hypolimnion is the coldest layer of a lake in summer, and the warmest layer during winter. In deep, temperate lakes, the bottom-most waters of the hypolimnion are typically close to 4 °C throughout the year. The hypolimnion may be much warmer in lakes at warmer latitudes. Being at depth, it is isolated from surface wind-mixing during summer, and usually receives insufficient irradiance (light) for photosynthesis to occur.

Oxygen dynamics 
The deepest portions of the hypolimnion have low oxygen concentrations. In eutrophic lakes, the hypolimnion is often anoxic. Deep mixing of lakes during the fall and early winter allows oxygen to be transported from the epilimnion to the hypolimnion. The cooling of the epilimnion during the fall reduces lake stratification and allows for mixing to occur. The hypolimnion can be anoxic for up to half the year. Anoxia is more common in the hypolimnion during the summer when mixing does not occur. In the absence of oxygen from the epilimnion, decomposition can cause hypoxia in the hypolimnion.

Hypolimnetic aeration 
In eutrophic lakes where the hypolimnion is anoxic, hypolimnetic aeration may be used to add oxygen to the hypolimnion. Adding oxygen to the system through aeration can be costly because it requires significant amounts of energy.

See also
Metalimnion

References

External links
Water on the Web 

Limnology
Aquatic ecology